The Stade L’Ayguade is a multi-use stadium in Hyères, France. It is currently used mostly for football. It is able to hold 600 people.

Football venues in France
Sports venues in Var (department)